Northeast Alabama is an ambiguous term, which may include the cities of Anniston, Gadsden, and Talladega, their surrounding areas, as well as the geographical northeast extreme of the state of Alabama. The county inclusion varies, and under some generous definitions would include the Birmingham–Hoover–Talladega, AL CSA as the largest and most diverse metropolitan area in the region, followed in population by the Anniston-Oxford MSA and Gadsden MSA. Huntsville, and rarely Auburn, may also be included but typically fall under other regional terms. A narrower and more colloquial use of the term Northeast Alabama may refer only to the areas around Scottsboro and Fort Payne and the Sand Mountain communities in the far northeast of the state, starting around Albertville. A person in Huntsville referring to Northeast Alabama may be using this narrower definition while Huntsville would be included in the broader term North Alabama. Likewise, Gadsden, Anniston, and Oxford may be referred to as part of East Alabama, while the areas in between Guntersville and Gadsden on Sand Mountain would most always be considered Northeast Alabama. Northeast Alabama Community College on the border of Jackson County and Dekalb County on Highway 35 west of Rainsville shares its name with the region, and Jacksonville State University in Jacksonville, Calhoun County is a public university in Northeast Alabama.

Locales

Metropolitan areas

Major cities

Counties
Areas in italics aren't traditionally included in the NE Alabama region

See also
Geography of Alabama
Snead State Community College
Gadsden State Community College

References

Regions of Alabama